Álvaro García Rivera (born 27 October 1992) is a Spanish professional footballer who plays for La Liga club Rayo Vallecano as a forward.

Career
Born in Utrera, Province of Seville, García finished his formation with local CG Goyu-Ryu, signing for CD Utrera in August 2011. He made his senior debuts in the 2011–12 season, with his team in the regional championships.

On 23 January 2013, García moved to San Fernando CD, in Segunda División B. He finished the campaign with 15 appearances (12 starts), scoring one goal.

On 6 July, García joined La Liga side Granada CF for four years. He featured with the first team during pre-season, and made his professional – and La Liga – debut on 18 August, playing the last twelve minutes of a 2–1 away win against CA Osasuna.

On 28 August 2014, García was loaned to Segunda División club Racing de Santander, in a season-long loan deal. Roughly a year later he moved to Cádiz CF, also in a temporary deal.

On 19 July 2016, after scoring a career-best nine goals in the Yellow Submarine's promotion campaign, García signed a permanent four-year deal after rescinding with Granada. On 14 January 2018, he scored a brace in a 2–0 home defeat of Córdoba CF.

On 13 August 2018, Cádiz announced that 50% of García's federative rights were sold to SD Huesca for a fee of €3 million, but the player announced hours later he would not play for the latter club. Ten days later, he joined Rayo Vallecano on a five-year contract.

Career statistics

Club

References

External links

1992 births
Living people
People from Utrera
Sportspeople from the Province of Seville
Spanish footballers
Footballers from Andalusia
Association football midfielders
La Liga players
Segunda División players
Segunda División B players
Divisiones Regionales de Fútbol players
CD Utrera players
San Fernando CD players
Club Recreativo Granada players
Granada CF footballers
Racing de Santander players
Cádiz CF players
Rayo Vallecano players